Daniel C. Harrington (born 1849; date of death unknown) was a Union Navy sailor in the American Civil War who received the U.S. military's highest decoration, the Medal of Honor.

Harrington was born in Ireland, and emigrated to the United States, registering for the Navy in Massachusetts. Several of his comrades were killed or wounded and Harrington helped the casualties.

His Medal of Honor was issued on April 3, 1863.

It is not known when Harrington died or where he is buried.

Medal of Honor citation

See also
List of American Civil War Medal of Honor recipients: G–L

Notes

References

External links

1849 births
Year of death unknown
American Civil War recipients of the Medal of Honor
Irish emigrants to the United States (before 1923)
Union Navy sailors
United States Navy Medal of Honor recipients
People of Massachusetts in the American Civil War